Cocky may mean:
 boldly or brashly self-confident
 Australian slang for cockatoo
 Australian and New Zealand slang for farmer
 Cocky (mascot), the mascot for the University of South Carolina athletics teams, a stylised gamecock
 Cocky (album), by Kid Rock, or the title track
 "Cocky", a 2017 song by Shea Couleé featuring The Vixen on the album Couleé-D
 "Cocky", a 2018 song by ASAP Rocky, Gucci Mane and 21 Savage featuring London on da Track